Volatile Times is the fourth studio album from IAMX. It was released on 18 March 2011 and the tracks on the album keep alive the cabaret-esque and dark electronic sound that Chris Corner has become known for. The track "Volatile Times" was featured on season 1 episode 5 of How to Get Away with Murder, both the US and instrumental versions of "I Salute You Christopher" on episode 11, as well as the US version of "Music People" on episode 14.

Release and promotion
Volatile Times is the first IAMX album released on vinyl.

New songs from the album that were performed on 22 October 2010 at the Prague show at Meet Factory included "Fire and Whispers", "Bernadette", "Oh Beautiful Town", "Music People", and "Cold Red Light".

The lead single from the album, "Ghosts of Utopia", premiered on Czech Radio 1 on 23 January. It was released as a digital download on 25 February and includes a remix by Noblesse Oblige, who were the supporting band for the Fire & Whispers Tour. A music video for the single, directed and edited by Chris Corner, premiered on tape.tv on 23 February.

A free download of "Fire and Whispers" was made available on 4 March, as part of the countdown of the album.  The full album was leaked online on 12 March, a fact that Corner acknowledged on the day of the album's release.

On 2 September 2013 the album was released digitally in the US with an alternative cover, and all songs were remixed and remastered by Chris Corner.

Track listing
 All songs written by Chris Corner:

Vinyl
2-vinyl, it includes the 11-track CD as a bonus.

US Edition

All songs reworked, and remastered by Chris Corner. Released digitally only.
 Music People
 Ghosts of Utopia
 Volatile Times (IAMseX UNFALL Rework)
 Fire and Whispers
 Bernadette
 Dance With Me
 Avalanches
 Cold Red Light
 Into Asylum
 Commanded By Voices
 Oh Beautiful Town
 I Salute You Christopher
 Bernadette (Post Romanian Storm)
 Volatile Times

Chart positions

References

2011 albums
IAMX albums